MV Wilhelm Gustloff was a German military transport ship which was sunk on 30 January 1945 by  in the Baltic Sea while evacuating civilian evacuees and military personnel from East Prussia and the German-occupied Baltic states, and German military personnel from Gotenhafen (Gdynia) as the Red Army advanced. By one estimate, 9,400 people died, making it the largest loss of life in a single ship sinking in history.

Originally constructed as a cruise ship for the Nazi Strength Through Joy (Kraft durch Freude) organization in 1937, Wilhelm Gustloff had been requisitioned by the Kriegsmarine (German navy) in 1939. She served as a hospital ship in 1939 and 1940. She was then assigned as a floating barracks for naval personnel in Gotenhafen before being fitted with anti-aircraft guns and put into service to transport evacuees in 1945.

Construction and naming 
Wilhelm Gustloff was constructed by the Blohm & Voss shipyards.

The ship was originally intended to be named Adolf Hitler but instead was christened after Wilhelm Gustloff, leader of the Nazi Party's Swiss branch, who had been assassinated by a Jewish medical student in 1936. Adolf Hitler decided on the name change after sitting next to Gustloff's widow during his memorial service. After completing sea trials in the North Sea from 15 to 16 March 1938 she was handed over to her owners.

Cruise ship
Wilhelm Gustloff was the first purpose-built cruise ship for the German Labour Front (Deutsche Arbeitsfront, DAF) and used by subsidiary organisation Strength Through Joy (Kraft durch Freude, KdF). Her purposes were to provide recreational and cultural activities for German functionaries and workers, including concerts, cruises, and other holiday trips, and to serve as a public relations tool that would present "a more acceptable image of the Third Reich". She was the flagship of the KdF cruise fleet, her last civilian role, until the spring of 1939.

The ship made her unofficial maiden voyage between 24 and 27 March 1938 carrying Austrians in an attempt to convince them to vote for the annexation of Austria by Germany. On 29 March she departed on her second voyage carrying workers and their families from the Blohm & Voss shipyard on a three-day cruise.

Rescue of Pegaway
For her third voyage Wilhelm Gustloff left Hamburg on 1 April 1938 under the command of Carl Lübbe to join the KdF ships Der Deutsche, Oceania and Sierra Cordoba on a group cruise of the North Sea. A storm developed on 3 April with winds up to  that forced the four ships apart. Meanwhile, the 1,836 gross ton coal freighter Pegaway, which had departed the Tyne on 2 April for Hamburg, was also caught up in the storm. Cargo and machinery were washed from Pegaways decks and the ship lost maneuverability as the storm increased in intensity. By 4 April, it was taking on water and slowly sinking.

The closest of the ships that answered the distress call was Wilhelm Gustloff, which reached Pegaway at 6 am. She launched her Lifeboat No. 1, with a crew of twelve under the command of Second Officer Meyer. The oar-powered lifeboat was unable to come aside Pegaway in the heavy seas and looked in danger of needing rescuing. Lifeboat No. 6, with a crew of ten under the command of Second Officer Schürmann, was then lowered. As it had a motor, it was better able to handle the waves.

After first assisting their shipmates in Lifeboat No. 1 to head back towards Wilhelm Gustloff, Schürmann was able to reach Pegaway. One by one the 19 men on Pegaway jumped into the sea and were hauled onto Lifeboat No. 6, with both them and the crew of the lifeboat back at Wilhelm Gustloff by 7:45 am. By now a Dutch tugboat had arrived but was unable to save Pegaway, which soon rolled to port and sank. Lifeboat No. 1 had been so badly damaged by the waves that after its crew had climbed up via ladders to the safety of their ship it was set adrift, to later be washed up on the shores of Terschelling on 2 May.

Anschluss
This allowed her to act as a floating polling station for German and Austrian citizens living in England who wished to vote on the approaching plebiscite on Germany's unification with Austria. During 10 April, 1,172 Germans and 806 Austrian eligible voters were ferried between the docks at Tilbury to the ship where 1,968 votes were cast in favour of the union and ten voted against. Once the voting was complete, Wilhelm Gustloff departed, reaching Hamburg on 12 April.

After undertaking a further voyage on 14 to 19 April 1938, the ship went on an Osterfahrt (Easter Voyage) before her actual official maiden voyage, which was undertaken from 21 April to 6 May 1938, when she joined Der Deutsche, Oceania and Sierra Cordoba on a group cruise to the Madeira Islands. On the second day of her voyage, the 58-year-old Captain Lübbe died on the bridge from a heart attack. He was replaced by Friedrich Petersen, who commanded Wilhelm Gustloff for the remainder of the cruise. Petersen left the ship until he returned as captain on her fatal voyage.

Condor Legion
Between 20 May and 2 June 1939, Wilhelm Gustloff was diverted from her pleasure cruises. With seven other ships in the KdF fleet, she transported the Condor Legion back to Germany from Spain following the victory of the Nationalist forces under General Francisco Franco in the Spanish Civil War.

From 14 March 1938 until 26 August 1939, the ship took over 80,000 passengers on a total of 60 voyages, all around Europe.

Military career

From September 1939 to November 1940, Wilhelm Gustloff served as a hospital ship, officially designated Lazarettschiff D. Beginning on 20 November 1940, medical equipment was removed from the ship and she was repainted from the hospital ship colors of white with a green stripe to standard naval grey.
As a consequence of the Allied blockade of the German coastline, she was used as a barracks ship for approximately 1,000 U-boat trainees of the 2nd Submarine Training Division (2. Unterseeboot-Lehrdivision) in the port of Gdynia, which had been occupied by Germany and renamed Gotenhafen, located near Danzig (Gdańsk). Wilhelm Gustloff sat in dock there for over four years. Filmed in Gotenhafen, the 2nd Submarine Training Division acted as extras in the movie. Eventually, Wilhelm Gustloff was put back into service transporting civilians and military personnel as part of Operation Hannibal.

Operation Hannibal – evacuation

Operation Hannibal was the naval evacuation of German troops and civilians from East Prussia and the German-occupied Baltic states as the Red Army advanced. Wilhelm Gustloffs final voyage was to evacuate German civilians, military personnel, and technicians from Courland, East Prussia, and Danzig-West Prussia. Many had worked at advanced weapon bases in the Baltic from Gotenhafen to Kiel.

The ship's complement and passenger lists cited 6,050 people on board, but these did not include many passengers who boarded the ship without being recorded in the official embarkation records. Heinz Schön, a German archivist and Gustloff survivor who extensively researched the sinking during the 1980s and 1990s, concluded that she was carrying a crew of 173 (naval armed forces auxiliaries); 918 officers, NCOs, and men of the 2 Unterseeboot-Lehrdivision; 373 female naval auxiliary helpers; 162 wounded soldiers and 8,956 civilians, for a total of 10,582 passengers and crew. The passengers, besides civilians, included Gestapo personnel, members of the Organisation Todt, and Nazi officials with their families. The ship was overcrowded, and due to the temperature and humidity inside, many passengers defied orders not to remove their life jackets. Besides ethnic Germans, the people on board included Lithuanians, Latvians, Poles, Estonians and Croatians, some of whom had been the victims of Nazi aggression..

The ship left Gotenhafen at 12:30 pm on 30 January 1945, accompanied by two torpedo boats and the passenger liner Hansa, which was carrying civilians and military personnel. Hansa and one torpedo boat developed mechanical problems and could not continue, leaving Wilhelm Gustloff with one torpedo boat escort, Löwe (ex-). The ship had four captains (Wilhelm Gustloff's captain, two merchant marine captains, and the captain of the U-boat complement housed on the vessel) on board, and they disagreed on the best course of action to guard against submarine attacks. Against the advice of the military commander, Lieutenant Commander Wilhelm Zahn (a submariner who argued for a course in shallow waters close to shore and without lights), Wilhelm Gustloff's captain, Friedrich Petersen, decided to head for deep water which was known to have been cleared of mines. When he was informed by a mysterious radio message of an oncoming German minesweeper convoy, Petersen decided to activate his ship's red and green navigation lights so as to avoid a collision in the dark, making Wilhelm Gustloff easy to spot in the dark.

As Wilhelm Gustloff had been fitted with anti-aircraft guns, and the Germans did not mark her as a hospital ship, no notification of her operating in a hospital capacity had been given and, as she was transporting military personnel, she did not have any protection as a hospital ship under international accords.

Sinking
The submarine sensor on board the escorting torpedo boat had frozen, rendering it inoperable, as had her anti-aircraft guns, leaving the vessels defenseless. Marinesko followed the ships to their starboard (seaward) side for two hours before making a daring move, surfacing his submarine and steering it around Wilhelm Gustloffs stern, to attack it from the port side closer to shore, from where the attack would be less expected.

The three torpedoes which were fired successfully all struck Wilhelm Gustloff on her port side. The first struck the ship's bow, causing watertight doors to seal off the area where off-duty crew members were sleeping. The second hit the accommodations for the women's naval auxiliary, located in the ship's drained swimming pool, dislodging the pool tiles at high velocity, which caused heavy casualties; only three of the 373 women quartered there survived.

Reportedly, only nine lifeboats could be lowered; the rest had frozen in their davits and had to be broken free. About twenty minutes after the torpedoes' impact, Wilhelm Gustloff suddenly listed so dramatically to port that the lifeboats lowered on the high starboard side crashed into the ship's tilting side, destroying many lifeboats and spilling their occupants.

Many deaths were caused either directly by the torpedoes or drowning in the onrushing water. Some fatalities were due to the initial stampede caused by panicked passengers on the stairs and decks. Many passengers jumped into the icy Baltic. The majority of those who perished succumbed to exposure in the freezing water.

Less than 40 minutes after being struck, Wilhelm Gustloff was lying on her side.

German forces were able to rescue 1,252 people: the torpedo boat  rescued 564; the torpedo boat Löwe, 472; the minesweeper M387, 98; the minesweeper M375, 43; the minesweeper M341, 37; the steamer Göttingen, 28; the torpedo recovery boat (Torpedofangboot) TF19, 7; the freighter Gotenland, two; and the patrol boat (Vorpostenboot) V1703, one baby. Thirteen survivors died later. All four captains on Wilhelm Gustloff survived her sinking, but an official naval inquiry was only initiated against Lieutenant Commander Zahn. His degree of responsibility was never resolved, however, because of Nazi Germany's collapse in 1945.

Losses
The figures from Schön's research make the loss in the Wilhelm Gustloff sinking to be "9,343 men, women and children". His more recent research is backed up by estimates arrived at by a different method. An Unsolved History episode that aired in March 2003, on the Discovery Channel, undertook a computer analysis of the sinking. Using Maritime Exodus software, it estimated that 9,600 people died out of more than 10,600 on board, by taking into account passenger density based on witness reports, and a simulation of escape routes and survivability with the timeline of the sinking.

Aftermath
Many ships were sunk during the war by the Allies and by the Axis Powers. However, based on the latest estimates of passenger numbers and those known to be saved, Wilhelm Gustloff remains by far the largest loss of life resulting from the sinking of a single vessel in maritime history. Günter Grass said in an interview published by The New York Times in April 2003: "One of the many reasons I wrote Crabwalk was to take the subject away from the extreme Right... They said the tragedy of Wilhelm Gustloff was a war crime. It wasn't. It was terrible, but it was a result of war, a terrible result of war."

About 1,000 German naval officers and men were aboard and died in the sinking of Wilhelm Gustloff. Women aboard the ship at the time of the sinking were inaccurately described by Soviet propaganda as "SS personnel from the German concentration camps". There were, however, 373 female naval auxiliaries amongst the passengers, only three of whom survived.

On the night of 9–10 February, just eleven days after the sinking, S-13 sank another German ship, killing about 4,500 people.

Before sinking Wilhelm Gustloff, Captain Marinesko was facing a court martial due to his alcohol problems and for being caught in a brothel while he and his crew were off duty. Marinesko was thus deemed "not suitable to be a hero" for the sinking and, instead of gaining the title Hero of the Soviet Union, he was awarded the lesser Order of the Red Banner. He was downgraded in rank to lieutenant and dishonorably discharged from the Soviet Navy in October 1945. In 1960, Marinesko was reinstated as captain third class and granted a full pension, and in 1963 was given the traditional ceremony due a captain upon the successful return from a mission. He died three weeks later from cancer at age 50. Marinesko was posthumously named a Hero of the Soviet Union by Soviet General Secretary Mikhail Gorbachev in 1990.

Wreckage

It is one of the largest shipwrecks on the Baltic Sea floor and has attracted much interest from treasure hunters searching for the lost Amber Room. In order to protect the property on board the war grave, as well as the wreck itself and the surrounding environment, the Polish Maritime Office in Gdynia has forbidden diving within a  radius of the wreck.

In 2006, a bell recovered from the wreck and subsequently used as a decoration in a Polish seafood restaurant was lent to the privately funded "Forced Paths" exhibition in Berlin.

Popular culture

Books:
Günter Grass: Im Krebsgang, translated into English as Crabwalk. Combines historical elements, such as the sinking of the Wilhelm Gustloff, with fictional elements, such as the book's major characters and events.
Ruta Sepetys: Salt to the Sea. Young Adult historical fiction about the lives of four fictional characters during the evacuation of East Prussia and the sinking of the Wilhelm Gustloff. Carnegie Medal winner (2017). 
I"ll Be Damned, the autobiography by the German-born American actor Eric Braeden, published by Harper Collins in 2017, discusses how he was a survivor of the MV Wilhelm Gustloff sinking.
 The prologue of Polar Shift features the sinking of the ship while a Resistance fighter trying to smuggle a scientist out of Nazi hands is on board. 
The novel The Other Side of Silence. London: Quercus, by Philip Kerr, includes in its plot the sinking of MV Wilhelm Gustloff by combining accurate historical facts and fictional characters.
Films:
Darkness Fell on Gotenhafen (Nacht fiel über Gotenhafen), feature film by Frank Wisbar, 1960
, two-part Television film by Joseph Vilsmaier, 2008
Documentaries:
"Killer Submarine," an episode of History's Mysteries, 1999.Die große Flucht. Der Untergang der Gustloff (The Great Escape. The sinking of Wilhelm Gustloff), 2001.
"The Sinking of the Wilhelm Gustloff", The Sea Hunters (television program), 2002.
"Wilhelm Gustloff: World's Deadliest Sea Disaster", Unsolved History (television program), 2003.Ghosts of the Baltic Sea, 2006.Sinking Hitler's Supership, 2008. National Geographic documentary using extensive footage from the 2008 German miniseries.Triumph und Tragödie der Wilhelm Gustloff, 2012.

See also

MV Goya, another ship taking part in Operation Hannibal, was also sunk by a Soviet submarine with just 183 survivors out of 7,000 passengers and crew.
Soviet hospital ship Armenia, sunk by German aircraft with only 8 survivors out of 5,000–7,000 passengers and crew.
SS Cap Arcona
MV Awa Maru
 Iosif Stalin Deutschland Thielbek Lancastria RMS Lusitania
List by death toll of ships sunk by submarines
List of maritime disasters
List of shipwrecks

References

Bibliography

Heath, Tim & Cocolin, Michela; Hitler's Lost State: The Fall of Prussia and the Wilhelm Gustloff Tragedy (Pen and Sword Military, 2020).
Kappes, Irwin J.; The Greatest Marine Disaster in History...and why you probably never heard of it, 2003.
Leja, Michael; Die letzte Fahrt der "Wilhelm Gustloff"; ZDF (1 August 2005), reports that earlier estimates of approximately 6000 drowned have been revised upwards by more recent sources to about 9300. An article in German.
Moorehouse, Roger; Ship of Fate: The Story of the MV Wilhelm Gustloff (Independently published, 2018).
Niven, Bill; "The Good Captain and the Bad Captain: Joseph Vilsmaier's "Die Gustloff" and the Erosion of Complexity" in German Politics & Society Vol. 26, No. 4 (89), SPECIAL ISSUE: Dynamics of Memory in 21st Century Germany (Winter 2008), pp. 82–98. 
Pipes, Jason; A Memorial to the Wilhelm Gustloff.
Prince, Cathryn J.; Death in the Baltic: The World War II Sinking of the Wilhelm Gustloff (St. Martin's Press, 2013).
Schön, Heinz; Die Gustloff Katastrophe (Motorbuch Verlag, Stuttgart, 2002).
Sellwood, A.V.; The Damned Don't Drown (TBS The Book Service Ltd, London, 1974).
Williams, David; Wartime Disasters at Sea (Patrick Stephens Limited, Nr Yeovil, UK, 1997) .

Further reading

Bishop, Leigh; Shipwreck Expedition May 2003, led by Mike Boring, 2003

External links
 A Memorial to the Wilhelm Gustloff
 Lazarettschiff D (Wilhelm Gustloff)

Details, map and position info on www.wrecksite.eu Schiff ohne Klassen - Die Wilhelm Gustloff  1938 propaganda film
Maritimequest Wilhelm Gustloff Photo Gallery
National Geographic Channel Timeline
Sinking the Gustloff (Film about Gustloff'' survivors)
The Wilhelm Gustloff Museum – The Ultimate Visual Record
Wilhelm Gustloff hi-rez images gallery

Cruise ships of Germany
Ships sunk by Soviet submarines
World War II shipwrecks in the Baltic Sea
Ships built in Hamburg
1937 ships
Hospital ships in World War II
1945 in Germany
Maritime incidents in January 1945
Shipwrecks of Poland